This is a List of Formula Renault 3.5 Series drivers, that is, a list of drivers who have made at least one entry in the Formula Renault 3.5 Series. This list does not count drivers who have only appeared in the previous World Series by Nissan and current World Series Formula V8 3.5. This list is accurate up to the end of the ninth and final round of the 2015 season.

By name

By racing license

Footnotes

External links
Speedsport Magazine
Timing results

 
Formula Renault 3.5 Series drivers